Katharina Gallhuber (born 16 June 1997) is an Austrian alpine ski racer.

World Cup results

Season standings

World Championship results

Olympic results

References

1997 births
Living people
Austrian female alpine skiers
Alpine skiers at the 2018 Winter Olympics
Alpine skiers at the 2022 Winter Olympics
Olympic alpine skiers of Austria
Medalists at the 2018 Winter Olympics
Olympic medalists in alpine skiing
Olympic silver medalists for Austria
Olympic bronze medalists for Austria